Secret Handshakes is Chicago rock-band Tub Ring's 6th album, and their second on The End Records. The CD was released on August 31, 2010. The album breaks several patterns of previous Tub Ring albums. For the first time, the title is unrelated to SETI and contains no "Robot" track. The predominant color of the album cover is red, in contrast to many earlier albums and promo shots which prominently featured blue.

Track listing

"Stop This (NOW!)"
"Bird Of A Different Color"
"Gold Finger"
"Touching The Enemy"
"Burn"
"Cryonic Love Song"
"Feed The Rapture"
"Flash"
"I Shot Your Faggot Horse Bitch"
"Chronic Hypersomnia"
"Optimistic"
"The Day The World Will End"
"Tip Of My Tongue"
"The Horrible And The Holy"

Personnel
Kevin Gibson – vocals
Rob Kleiner – keyboards, producer
Trevor Erb – bass guitar
Scott Radway - drums, percussion
Patrick Windsor - guitar, piano
Jason Zolghadr tar
Loren Turner guitar
Dave Smith baritone sax
Brandon Wojcik trumpet
David Keller cello
Benjamin Weber - viola, violin
Chibi - vocals

References

Secret Handshakes
Secret Handshakes
The End Records albums